Dayotchanculle Oswald Upamecano (born 27 October 1998) is a French professional footballer who plays as a centre-back for Bundesliga club Bayern Munich and the France national team. Upamecano is known for his tackling and ball-playing ability.

Early life and career
Dayotchanculle Oswald Upamecano was born on 27 October 1998 in Évreux, Normandy and is of Bissau-Guinean descent. He was raised in La Madeleine, a neighbourhood with many African immigrants. He was named after his great-grandfather, who was king of the village on the island of Jeta in Guinea-Bissau, which his parents are from. He is the first son after four daughters, and has one younger brother. As a 15-year-old, he followed speech therapy sessions to overcome dyslexia and stuttering disorders, which caused shyness and certain difficulties in expressing himself.

Upamecano began playing football with local club Évreux, alongside the likes of Ousmane Dembélé, Rafik Guitane and Samuel Grandsir. He covered a variety of positions in his youth, before being fixed on the centre-back position. He joined the youth academy of Valenciennes in 2013. Described during the time as a youth in an adult body, Upamecano shaped his play after Sergio Ramos, and developed into a physically imposing defender.

Club career

Red Bull Salzburg

After attracting the attention of a number of major European clubs, including Manchester United, Upamecano joined Red Bull Salzburg in July 2015 for a reported fee of €2.2 million. He was an unused substitute in Red Bull's UEFA Champions League game against Malmö FF on 29 July 2015. He made his professional debut for Red Bull's farm team, FC Liefering, two days later, in a 2–1 league win against St. Pölten. On 19 March 2016, he made his league debut with Red Bull Salzburg in a 2–1 win over SV Mattersburg.

In the first half of the 2016–17 season, Upamecano earned a regular place with the first team in both league and Europa League matches.

RB Leipzig
On 13 January 2017, Upamecano joined RB Leipzig on a -year deal, for a reported €10 million fee. On 4 February 2017, he made his Bundesliga debut under coach Ralph Hasenhüttl in a 1–0 defeat against Borussia Dortmund. On 13 September 2017, he made his Champions League debut in a 1–1 draw against Monaco. On 9 February 2018, he scored his first goal in a 2–0 win over Augsburg. On 2 July 2018, he was shortlisted for the 2018 Golden Boy award.

On 31 July 2020, Upamecano signed a new deal until 2023. In the 2019–20 season, he reached with RB Leipzig the Champions League semi-finals under coach Julian Nagelsmann.

Bayern Munich
On 14 February 2021, Bayern Munich announced an agreement for the signing of Upamecano on a five-year deal, to be effective as of 1 July 2021. The club reportedly met his release clause from Leipzig, set at €42.5 million. Upamecano's first game as a Bayern player came in a pre-season friendly on 16 July 2021 against fellow Bundesliga side 1. FC Köln that saw Bayern lose 3–2 after fielding a side largely consisting of reserve and youth players. 

He made his competitive debut on the opening day of the 2021–22 Bundesliga season, starting at centre-back alongside Niklas Süle in a 1–1 away draw against Borussia Mönchengladbach. He scored his first goal for the club in a 4–0 win over VfL Wolfsburg on 17 December, heading in a cross from Thomas Müller.

International career
Upamecano played for the France under-16 team that finished third in the 2014 Aegean Cup. He played in three of his country's four games and was named the competition's best defender. He subsequently moved up to the France under-17 squad, making his debut in a European Championship qualifier against Cyprus on 27 October 2014. France won the 2015 UEFA European Under-17 Championship, with Upamecano playing in all six of his country's matches and being named in the team of the tournament. He made his debut for France under-18 in a 0–0 friendly draw with United States under-18 on 4 September 2015.

Upamecano made his debut for the France national football team, on 5 September 2020, starting in a UEFA Nations League group-stage match against Sweden. Three days later on 8 September, he scored his first international goal in a 4–2 win against Croatia.

Upamecano played a pivotal role in France's 2022 FIFA World Cup, starting five of France's seven matches. This includes playing the entire 120 minutes in the final in an eventual 3-3 loss in penalties to Argentina.

Career statistics

Club

International

Scores and results list the France's goal tally first. Score column indicates score after each Upamecano goal

Honours
Bayern Munich
Bundesliga: 2021–22
DFL-Supercup: 2021, 2022

France U17
UEFA European Under-17 Championship: 2015

France
UEFA Nations League: 2020–21
FIFA World Cup runner-up: 2022

Individual
UEFA European Under-17 Championship Team of the Tournament: 2015
UEFA Champions League Squad of the Season: 2019–20
ESM Team of the Year: 2019–20

References

External links

Profile at the FC Bayern Munich website

1998 births
Living people
Sportspeople from Évreux
Footballers from Normandy
French footballers
Association football defenders
FC Red Bull Salzburg players
FC Liefering players
RB Leipzig players
FC Bayern Munich footballers
Bundesliga players
Austrian Football Bundesliga players
France youth international footballers
France under-21 international footballers
France international footballers
2022 FIFA World Cup players
UEFA Nations League-winning players
French expatriate footballers
Expatriate footballers in Austria
Expatriate footballers in Germany
French expatriate sportspeople in Austria
French expatriate sportspeople in Germany
Black French sportspeople
French people of Bissau-Guinean descent
Sportspeople with dyslexia